Mariana Alandia Navajas (Tarija) is a Bolivian classical pianist who interpreted most of the 20th century Bolivian classical composers.

Biography
Mariana Navajas Alandia began her piano studies with the teachers Mario Estensoro and Sarah Ismael. Further studies with Miguel Angel Quesada in Costa Rica, and later chamber music with Ramiro Soriano Arce at the National Conservatory of Music in La Paz, Bolivia, where she completed a piano degree. Corsi di perfezionamento musicale at the Academy G. Curci with Hector Pell (Rome) and Academia Chigiana , (Siena). Concerts in Bolivia, Italy, Austria and Peru.  Her interpretations of the Bolivian composers are based on researches into Bolivian music history.

Texts
Piano music of Eduardo Caba, Humberto Viscarra Monje, Marvin Sandi, Alberto Villapando , and  Florencio Pozadas:
Alandia, Mariana y Parrado, Javier. 2003 „A la vera del Piano“: T'inzakos, Revista Boliviana de Ciencias Sociales cuatrimestral del Programa de Investigación Estratégica en Bolivia (PIEB). Número 14 Juni 2003 
No Hay caminos, hay que caminar... (about the interpretation and repertoire selection). Website: Germinaciones.

Recordings
Recording at the premiere of the recently found manuscript of Eduardo Caba's Aire Indio # 7 at the Espacio Simón I. Patiño auditorium (La Paz, 2009).
Internet audio streaming: Rádio USP FM 93,7 MHz Brazil: Music of the Bolivian composer Gastón Arce.
1997 Cassette: Orquesta Experimental de Instrumentos. Conductor: Nativos Cergio Prudencio.
1989 Cassette: Música de misiones jesuíticas, Cerruti y Zipoli mit Coral Nova (órgano). Proaudio.
1994 CD Sayariy soundtrack (Umbrales von Cergio Prudencio). Proton.
2001 CD Música Boliviana del Siglo XX. Gastón Arce y Alberto Villalpando Villalpando. Estudios Cantvs.

Selection of concerts

Bolivia:
La Paz. September 2009. Premiere of 3 new Aires Indios of Eduardo Caba 
La Paz. May.2009. Beethoven 1. Klavierkonzert. Bolivian National Symphonic Orcuestra. Dirigent: Willy Pozadas
La Paz. Proyecto Germinaciones 2008
Cochabamba 2008 
Santa Cruz 

Italy: Progetto Musica 2002 , Nuove Forme Sonore, 
Mariana Alandia Navajas, pianoforte:
Florencio Pozadas: Senza titolo
Eduardo Caba: Aire Indios
Javier Parrado: Mòvil
  Eduardo Bértola: dorate mele del sole
Jorge Ibáñez: Contemplazioni 1° 2°, 9°, 5° y 8°
Cergio Prudencio: Ambiti

Classical pianists
Living people
Year of birth missing (living people)
People from Tarija
Bolivian classical musicians
20th-century classical pianists
21st-century classical pianists
Women classical pianists
20th-century women pianists
21st-century women pianists